Drummuie, formerly Golspie Technical School, is a municipal structure in Drummuie Terrace, Golspie, Highland, Scotland. The complex, which was the headquarters of Sutherland County Council and is currently used as council offices for The Highland Council, is a Category B listed building.

History

The Drummuie estate has its origins in Drummuie House, which was commissioned by a veteran of the Napoleonic Wars, Captain Robert Sutherland, and was completed in 1809. In the early 20th century, Millicent Leveson-Gower, Duchess of Sutherland decided to commission a technical school for the education of the sons of local crofters. Her husband, Cromartie Sutherland-Leveson-Gower, 4th Duke of Sutherland donated the land; the major contributors to the cost of construction were The Duke of Sutherland and the American businessman, Andrew Carnegie. The site they selected was just to the west of Drummuie House.

The foundation stone for the new building was laid by Alexander Bruce, 6th Lord Balfour of Burleigh in 1903. It was designed by John More Dick Peddie and George Washington Browne in the
Renaissance Revival style, built in rubble masonry and was officially opened on 3 October 1904. The design involved a symmetrical main frontage of fifteen bays facing south towards the A9 road with the end bays projected forward as pavilions. The main frontage incorporated a three-bay central section which was slightly projected forward and featured a doorway with an architrave surmounted by a panel inscribed with the words "Let there be light". The panel was supported by brackets and flanked by obelisks. On the first floor, there was a central window flanked by Doric order pilasters supporting an entablature inscribed "MFS 1903" which was surmounted by a round headed hood mould. The inscription MFS recalled the main benefactor, Millicent Fanny Sutherland. The main frontage was fenestrated on both floors by sash windows. The end bays, which incorporated an extra storey, were fenestrated by three sash windows on the ground floor and by single sash windows on the first and second floors. At roof level, the three-bay central section was surmounted by a stepped gable with a central stack at the apex. Meanwhile, Dummuie House was converted for use as the home of the headmaster of the technical school.

The main building continued to serve as a technical school until around 1965 when it became the headquarters of Sutherland County Council. At that time, some £5 million was spent on acquiring and improving the site. Meanwhile, Drummuie House became surplus to requirements and was acquired by Dr George Murray. After the abolition of Sutherland County Council in 1975, ownership of the main building passed to Highland Regional Council, and, following the formation of unitary authorities in 1995, ownership passed to The Highland Council.

In the 2000, the main building became vacant and the fabric of the building subsequently deteriorated. Between August 2006 and March 2008, it was the subject of an extensive programme of refurbishment works. The works, which included external repairs, the refurbishment of the interior and the landscaping of the site, were carried out by Morrison Construction at a cost of £3.5 million to a design by Colin Armstrong Associates. The building was officially re-opened by the council convenor, Sandy Park, on 3 October 2008.

See also
 List of listed buildings in Golspie, Highland

References

Government buildings completed in 1904
County halls in Scotland
Category B listed buildings in Highland (council area)
Defunct schools in Highland (council area)